In cosmological models of the Big Bang, the lepton epoch was the period in the evolution of the early universe in which the leptons dominated the mass of the Universe. It started roughly 1 second after the Big Bang, after the majority of hadrons and anti-hadrons annihilated each other at the end of the hadron epoch. During the lepton epoch, the temperature of the Universe was still high enough to create neutrino and electron-positron pairs. Approximately 10 seconds after the Big Bang, the temperature of the universe had fallen to the point where electron-positron pairs were gradually annihilated. A small residue of electrons needed to charge-neutralize the Universe remained along with free streaming neutrinos: an important aspect of this epoch is the neutrino decoupling. The Big Bang nucleosynthesis epoch follows, overlapping with the photon epoch.

See also
 Chronology of the universe
 Cosmology
 Big Bang

References

Physical cosmology
Big Bang